The Red Shadows is a 2009 Italian drama film written and directed by Francesco Maselli. For the French TV series see Les Ombres rouges.

It was screened out of competition at the 66th Venice International Film Festival.

Cast  
 Ennio Fantastichini as Varga
 Arnoldo Foà as  Massimo
 Roberto Herlitzka as Sergio Siniscalchi
  Valentina Carnelutti as  Margherita
  Flavio Parenti as  Davide
 Lucia Poli as  Vanessa
  Eugenia Costantini as  Betta
 Luca Lionello as Stefano
  Carmelo Galati as  Alessandro
  Veronica Gentili as  Rossana 
  Antonino Bruschetta as  Conduttore TV1
 Roberto Citran as  Bergonzi
 Laurent Terzieff as  Director of Le Monde 
 Ricky Tognazzi as  Politician

References

External links

2000s political drama films
Italian political drama films
Films directed by Francesco Maselli
2009 drama films
2009 films
2000s Italian-language films
2000s Italian films